Ashmead Romano Nedd (born 10 January 2001) is a West Indian cricketer. He made his List A debut on 9 November 2019, for the West Indies Emerging Team in the 2019–20 Regional Super50 tournament. Prior to his List A debut, he was named in the West Indies' squad for the 2018 Under-19 Cricket World Cup. In November 2019, he was named in the West Indies' squad for the 2020 Under-19 Cricket World Cup. He was the leading wicket-taker for the West Indies in the tournament, with eleven dismissals in six matches.

In June 2020, Nedd was selected by the Leeward Islands, in the players' draft hosted by Cricket West Indies ahead of the 2020–21 domestic season. In July 2020, he was named in the Guyana Amazon Warriors squad for the 2020 Caribbean Premier League (CPL). He made his Twenty20 debut on 22 August 2020, for the Guyana Amazon Warriors in the 2020 CPL.

References

External links
 

2001 births
Living people
West Indies Emerging Team cricketers
Guyana Amazon Warriors cricketers
Place of birth missing (living people)